Mount Provender is a conspicuous rock mountain, 900 m, marking the northwest extremity of the Shackleton Range. It was first mapped in 1957 by the Commonwealth Trans-Antarctic Expedition and so named because members of the Commonwealth Trans-Antarctic Expedition established a depot of food and fuel and an airplane camp on the south side of the mountain in 1957 to support sledging parties working in the Shackleton Range.

Mountains of Coats Land